Jolis is a surname. Notable people with the surname include:

Albert Jolis (1912–2000), American anti-communist
Chantal Jolis (1947–2012), Canadian radio and television host
Isabel Jolís Oliver (1682–1770), Spanish printer and engraver

See also
Joli